M. canis  may refer to:
 Microsporum canis, a fungus species that causes Tinea capitis in humans
 Mustelus canis, the dusky smooth-hound or smooth dogfish, a hound shark species

See also
 Canis (disambiguation)